Moteb Saad Al-Harbi (born 19 February 2000) is a Saudi Arabian professional footballer who plays for Al-Shabab as a left back.

Career
Al-Harbi started his career at the youth team of Al-Shabab and represented the club at every level. On 2 March 2020, he signed his first professional contract with Al-Shabab.

Honours

International
Saudi Arabia U23
AFC U-23 Asian Cup: 2022

Individual
 Saudi Professional League Young Player of the Month: August 2021, October 2021, November 2021, January 2022

References

External links
 

2000 births
Living people
Saudi Arabian footballers
Saudi Arabia youth international footballers
Saudi Arabia international footballers
Association football fullbacks
Al-Shabab FC (Riyadh) players
Saudi Professional League players